is a railway station on the JR West San'yō Main Line (JR Kobe Line) in Suma-ku, Kobe, Hyōgo Prefecture, Japan.

A pathway connects the station's south exit with the Suma beach on the Seto Inland Sea, while the  Sanyo Electric Railway Suma Station is a short walk on the north side.

Operation
The station consists of two island platforms serving a total of four local tracks, with two additional express tracks on the north side for passing trains. Rapid Service trains stop here but the Special Rapid train service runs on the express tracks, bypassing the station.

Layout

Adjacent stations

External links
JR West - Suma Station

JR Kobe Line
Sanyō Main Line
Railway stations in Kobe
Railway stations in Japan opened in 1888